Skuru IK is a sports club in Skuru in Nacka, Sweden, established on 22 October 1922. The club runs basketball, gymnastics, handball and swimming activity, previously even bowling and ice hockey. The club began to play handball in 1950 and the women's handball team won the Swedish national indoor championship titles in 2001, 2004 and 2005.

Handball women's team european record

Team

References

External links
 Official website 

1922 establishments in Sweden
Basketball teams in Sweden
Defunct ice hockey teams in Sweden
Gymnastics clubs
Sports clubs established in 1922
Swedish handball clubs
Swimming clubs
Multi-sport clubs in Sweden